Corfu International Airport "Ioannis Kapodistrias" or Ioannis Kapodistrias (Capodistrias) International Airport  is a government-owned airport on the Greek island of Corfu at Kerkyra, serving both scheduled and charter flights from European cities. Air traffic peaks during the summer season, between April and October.

The Ioannis Kapodistrias International Airport, named after Ioannis Kapodistrias, a distinguished Corfiot diplomat and the first governor of Greece, is located around 2 kilometres south of Corfu Town, and half a kilometre north of Pontikonisi. A 2021 study found that Corfu International Airport was one of the top 20 most vulnerable airports to climate change caused sea level rise.

History 

The airport was founded in 1937. During the Second World War, it was used by German and Italian forces as a base for transport and fighter aircraft.
During the war the runway length was 600 m. By the end of April 1949, the length had reached 800 m. A further extension to 1,260 m took place by the end of 1951 to meet the then larger aircraft needs. The next and last extension of the runway began in 1957 and was completed in 1959, with a length of 2,373m.
The first commercial flight took place on 19 April 1949 from Athens operated by TAE Greek National Airlines. On 2 September 1950, HELLAS also started flights to Corfu.
In 1962, a small passenger terminal was built, which today accommodates the Corfu Aeroclub. In April 1965, the airport became International, with the inaugural overseas flight being operated by Olympic Airlines. The construction of the new passenger terminal began in 1968 and was completed in 1972.

In December 2015, the privatisation of Corfu International Airport and 13 other regional airports of Greece was finalised with the signing of the agreement (as a joint venture) between Fraport AG/Copelouzos Group and state privatisation fund Hellenic Republic Asset Development Fund. "We signed the deal today," the head of Greece's privatisation agency HRADF, Stergios Pitsiorlas, told Reuters. According to the agreement, the joint venture will operate the 14 airports (including Corfu International Airport) for 40 years as of 11 April 2017.

Fraport Greece's investment plan 
On 22 March 2017, Fraport Greece presented its master plan for the 14 regional airports including Corfu International Airport.

Immediate actions that were implemented as soon as Fraport-Greece took over operations included a general clean-up of the airport, improving lighting and sanitary facilities and the markings of airside areas, as well as offering free WiFi and ensuring fire safety standards are met throughout the airport and surrounding property.

The master plan also included changes which will be implemented under Fraport-Greece's investment plan prior to 2021. They include the remodeling and expansion of the current terminal as well as the construction of a new one. A Hold Baggage inline Screening System (HBS) will improve safety and efficiency, along with the refurbishment of the airport fire service, which will benefit from the reorganization of the airport apron area including the replacement of paving in this area. Also planned is the increase of the number of check-in desks from 22 to 28, and the number of departure gates to 12, as well as reorganisation of the security check lanes in the terminal.

Airlines and destinations
The following airlines operate regular scheduled and charter flights at Corfu Airport:

Traffic figures

The data are from the official website of the airport.

Traffic statistics by country (2022)

Ground transport
By car or taxi Corfu Airport is located 2.7 km from the city of Corfu and takes about 10 minutes. Bus services are provided between the airport and the city centre.

See also
Transport in Greece

References

External links 

 Official Corfu Airport website: Corfu Airport - Homepage English/Greek
 Pictures from Corfu Airport: from JetPhotos.ch

Airports in Greece
Buildings and structures in Corfu
Ioannis Kapodistrias